Huang Mei-ying is a Taiwanese politician. She is currently the Chairperson of Fair Trade Commission since 1 February 2017.

Education
Huang obtained her bachelor's and master's degree in agricultural economics from National Taiwan University and doctoral degree in economics from University of Georgia in the United States.

Fair Trade Commission
After being sworn in as the chairperson of Fair Trade Commission on 1 February 2017 alongside deputy Perng Shaw-jiin, Huang said that she planned to further promote cooperation and coordination between ministry agencies to achieve market liberalization and improve fair trade competition in Taiwan by revising relevant laws and regulations, improving control of multi-level marketing, increasing international exchanges and participating in cross-border cooperation.

References

Living people
Women government ministers of Taiwan
Government ministers of Taiwan
Year of birth missing (living people)
21st-century Taiwanese women politicians
21st-century Taiwanese politicians
University of Georgia alumni
Taiwanese expatriates in the United States
National Taiwan University alumni